Paola Ulloa Jiménez (born 26 December 1996) is a Spanish professional footballer who plays as a goalkeeper for Liga F club Madrid CFF.

Club career
Ulloa started her career at Madrid CFF.

References

External links
Profile at La Liga

1996 births
Living people
Women's association football goalkeepers
Spanish women's footballers
Footballers from Madrid
Madrid CFF players
Primera División (women) players